The draw for the Round of 16 of the 2009–10 Libyan Cup was made on January 28, 2010 at 21:30 EET. The dates and times for the 8 ties were confirmed on January 31. Ties are to be played over the period February 7–February 9, 2010. If any of the ties end in a draw after 90 minutes, then the tie goes immediately to a penalty shootout.

Ties 
All times local (EET)

References 

2009–10 Libyan Cup